State Route 117 (SR 117) is a  state highway in the U.S. state of Alabama.

Route description
Alabama State Route 117 begins at the Georgia line near the town of Mentone. It winds through slightly mountainous terrain before entering the town of Mentone. This town is among the highest points in the state, at a maximum height of 1800ft. It descends down Lookout Mountain and enters Valley Head, which is at about 1000ft elevation. The route turns northwest and enters Hammondville, where it junctions with and maintains a short concurrency with U.S. Route 11. It turns off of the route and junctions with I-59.

It junctions with AL-40 west. It continues northwest and enters Ider. It junctions with AL-75. It continues over the Jackson County line.

It enters Flat Rock and junctions with AL-71. The route descends down Sand Mountain and enters Stevenson. It junctions with U.S. 72 at a diamond interchange. It continues into downtown and turns off of its right of way, entering the plains of northern Jackson County. It passes through a few ridges and some unincorporated communities before turning off of its right-of-way again. It continues east for about two miles before turning north again. It crosses the Tennessee state line in the unincorporated community of Sherwood, where it immediately turns off of its right-of-way again as TN-56 and crosses a railroad track directly beside a Lhoist North America industrial plant. 

This route is an important corridor, connecting one of the lowest parts of North Alabama with one of the highest parts of North Alabama.

Major intersections

See also

References

117
Transportation in DeKalb County, Alabama
Transportation in Jackson County, Alabama